The Radio Pirates is a Norwegian family film released in 2007, directed by first-time director Stig Svendsen and is based on a radio play by Gunnar Germundson. It stars Gard B. Eidsvold, Per Christian Ellefsen, Henrik Mestad and Ane Dahl Torp.

Plot
The Radio Pirates is the story of Karl Jonathan and his father. They leave the city for the father's dilapidated childhood home but soon realise that the entire village of "Skjelleruten" has been transformed into the ultimate safe society, where children are strictly protected from behaving like children. Karl Jonathan and his new friend, Sisseline, start an uprising against this model village with the aid of a closed-down pirate radio. But the model citizens refuse to give in without a fight.

External links
 

2007 films
Norwegian comedy films
2000s Norwegian-language films
2007 directorial debut films